The 2007 Colorado Buffaloes football team represented the University of Colorado at Boulder in the 2007 NCAA Division I FBS football season. The team was coached by Dan Hawkins in his second season at Colorado and played their home games at Folsom Field. Colorado finished 6–7 after losing in the Independence Bowl to Alabama. 2007 was Colorado's first consecutive losing season in 22 years, but represented a vast improvement over the team's 2–10 mark in 2006.

Pre-season

Spring practice 
Official CU Spring Game website
Prior to spring practice, there were two position changes planned: Cha’pelle Brown will move from cornerback to wide receiver, and Joe Sanders will switch back to tight end from outside linebacker. Sanders started his career at tight end but two weeks into his first spring practice moved to inside linebacker (he missed the fall of his freshman year after undergoing shoulder surgery).

Nine players will not return from the 2006 squad: Paul Backowski (OL), Quinton Borders (OL), Dominique Brooks (S), Clayton Cammon (WR, walkon), Steve Fendry (TE), Isaac Garden (P/PK, walkon, graduated), Tom Grubin (C, walkon), Jeremy Hauck (OL) and Reggie Joseph (WR).

The annual spring game occurred on April 14. The game consisted of a mix between live scrimmages and 7-on-7 drills due to the shortage of healthy and eligible offensive linemen. The offense was remarked as having made improvements compared to last season's spring game.

Bernard Jackson, the starting quarterback from last season saw limited time at the position during spring practice and was used as a wide receiver, running back, punt and kick returner. Cody Hawkins (Red shirt Freshman) and Nick Nelson (JC transfer Junior) competed for the quarterback position. Hawkins completed 12-of-20 passes for 119 yards an interception and a touchdown in live action. In 7-on-7 drills, he completed 15-of-23 passes for 182 yards and two touchdowns. Nelson completed 3-of-10 passes for 30 yards and an interception and also had two rushes for 20 yards during live action. In 7-on-7 drills, he completed 21-of-28 passes for 256 yards with two touchdowns and an interception.

Awards 
 Jordon Dizon
 Lott Trophy watchlist
 Daniel Sanders
 Dave Rimington Trophy watchlist
 Terrence Wheatley
 Jim Thorpe Award watchlist

Infraction 
In June 2007, the Buffaloes were placed under probation for two years and fined US$100,000 for undercharging 133 student-athletes for meals over a six-year span (2000–01 to 2005–06) resulting in the major infraction. The football program, with 86 of the 133 student-athletes involved, also lost one scholarship for the next three seasons.

Recruiting 
National Signing Day was on February 7, 2007, and Colorado signed high school athletes from around the country. Colorado's overall team ranking was 35th by Scout.com and 31st by Rivals.com. Colorado had 31 scholarships available.

Official CU Signing Day Central

|-
|colspan="20"|2006 = counts towards 2006 class
|-
|colspan="20"|
 Jess Beets (OL, 6–3, 280) from Mission Viejo, CA (Saddleback JC) had given a verbal commitment but picked Kentucky over Colorado.
 Apaiata Tuihalamaka (LB, 6–3, 205) from Gardena, CA (Junipero Serra HS) had given a verbal commitment to Colorado on November 15, 2006, but later retracted and gave a verbal commitment to the Arizona Wildcats on December 1, 2006.
 Devonne Quattlebaum (S, 6–0, 175) from Monetta, SC (Ridge-Spring Monetta HS) had given a verbal commitment to Colorado in November. But he took another recruiting visit to South Carolina State University in late January and gave a "solid verbal" to them afterwards.
 Adam Tello (OL, 6–4, 290) from Norco, CA (Norco HS) had verbally committed to Colorado but later retracted giving a commitment to Arizona State on February 6, 2007.
 Garth Gerhart (OL, 6–2, 300) from Norco, CA (Norco HS) had verbally committed to Colorado but gave a verbal commitment to Arizona State on February 6, 2007.
 Robert Hall (LB, 6–2, 220) from Friendswood, TX (Friendswood HS) was reported as committing to Colorado but did not sign.

Uniform changes 
Images of new uniforms
On June 2, 2007, Colorado announced changes to their uniforms. Most notable is the incorporation of silver into the uniform combining the two school colors, silver and gold, for the first time. The "COLORADO" across the chest and player names on the back are now smaller, and will be gold instead of white (the only color it has ever been). The numbers will now be silver. The pants now have trim on the sides; silver on the gold pants and gold on the black pants. The white pants have now been eliminated. In addition to the design change, the new uniforms designed by Nike also improve technical parts of the uniform including innovative fit, weight reduction, increased ventilation and improved moisture management.

Schedule 
The schedule was ranked as the No. 10 toughest home schedule.

Roster 
Michael Sipili was charged with assault for being suspected for fighting with Taj Kaynor, defensive tackle, also involving Chris Perri, sophomore defensive tackle on June 22, 2007. Sipili and Perri were suspended for the first three games and Kaynor was suspended for the first game. Sipili was later suspended from campus on September 21, 2007, for the fall semester over the incident forcing him to miss the entire season. As a true sophomore, he will likely use this season as a redshirt and have 3 years remaining of eligibility.

Starting running back Hugh Charles suffered a pulled hamstring on the first series of the Colorado State game, forcing him to miss the rest of that game and the Arizona State game the following week.

Coaching staff

Game summaries

Colorado State 

The 2007 Qwest Rocky Mountain Showdown was back in Invesco Field at Mile High in Denver, CO with the kickoff at 10:10 am MDT. Both the Colorado Buffaloes and Colorado State Rams were coming off losing seasons. Colorado State won last season's game and the series was tied at 4–4 over the last 8 games coming into the game. Colorado State returned running back Kyle Bell who missed last season due to an injury. Colorado started quarterback Cody Hawkins, head coach Dan Hawkins' son and a redshirt freshman in his first start at the college level.

Colorado had been favored entering the game. This was Colorado's 200th game against current members of the Mountain West Conference, with a 137–55–7 record. Colorado was 73–39–5 in their 117-season openers and had won five of its last eight season openers entering the game. Colorado was 8–5, prior to the game, against intrastate rival Colorado State when the Rams have been the opposition in the season opener.

The game was not sold out, with the low sales possibly due to the losing records of both teams last season. There were about 9,000 tickets still available a week before the game. Invesco Field has a capacity of 76,125. A crowd of 68,133 ultimately attended the game.

Colorado made a come from behind victory to force overtime and then win the game. The game started with the first three series scoring touchdowns. Cody Hawkins completed 18 of 31 passes for 201 yards, two touchdowns and one interception. Colorado State's Kyle Bell rushed for a career-high 40 times for 135 yards and a touchdown. Colorado State's quarterback, Hanie went 20-of-27 and threw three touchdown passes to tight end Kory Sperry and one interception, in overtime.

Colorado State won the coin toss in overtime and elected to go first. Terrence Wheatley made an interception to end the Rams' OT side. Kevin Eberhart, senior place kicker, had a good game going 3 for 4 with a career long 38-yard field goal before halftime, a 22-yard field goal with 13 seconds left to send the game into overtime and the game winning 35-yard kick in overtime.

Colorado lost their starting running back, Hugh Charles early in the first quarter with a pulled hamstring. The backup, Demetrius Sumler rushed 16 times for 85-yards.

External link: https://web.archive.org/web/20070827084821/http://www.qwestrockymountainshowdown.com/

Arizona State 

Colorado lost last season to Arizona State (21–3), the only time the teams have previously played each other. The game was scheduled to start at 8:28 p.m. Mountain Time. Entering the game, Colorado had a 9–2 record in the state of Arizona, including 8–0 against the Arizona Wildcats and 1–2 in the Fiesta Bowl. A sellout crowd larger than 71,000 was expected to be in attendance. Colorado had won their last two road games against Pacific-10 Conference opponents before this game; Washington State Cougars in 2004 and UCLA Bruins in 2003.

Arizona State entered the game 1–0, with a win the previous week over the San Jose State Spartans. Head coach Dennis Erickson was going for his 150th win in his 215th game. Coming into the game, Arizona State was 3–2 all time against the Big 12 Conference.

The Buffaloes scored two touchdowns in the first quarter including an interception return for a touchdown by Terrence Wheatley, while holding the Sun Devils scoreless. ASU responded with three touchowns in the second quarter, but they missed their second extra point (wide left) and their attempt at a two-point conversion after their third touchdown, so they took a 19–14 lead into halftime. Colorado did not score for the rest of the game. Arizona added two more touchdowns in the third quarter.

The actual crowd attendance was 58,417.

Florida State 

Colorado welcomed Florida State (1–1) for their home opener. Florida State won the only previous game between the two schools on September 20, 2003.

Florida State came into the game with a win the previous week over the UAB Blazers and a loss in the season opener against the Clemson Tigers. The game was scheduled to start at 8:10 p.m. Mountain Time and aired on ESPN. There were approximately 3,000 tickets remaining 3 days before the game. Florida State was 15–11 all-time against Big 12 Conference teams coming into the game.

Colorado was 7–5 all-time against Atlantic Coast Conference teams and 0–4 when playing on September 15 before the game. There were only 4 current Colorado players that dressed for the previous match-up in 2003: Eberhart, Wheatley, Robinson and Sanders. Colorado students and fans were planning to "black out" the stadium by wearing black clothing.

Actual attendance was 52,951. Colorado's Eberhart missed two field goals of 37 and 46 yards. Colorado scored a touchdown with 3:36 left in the game to keep their record scoring streak alive; the latest score in a game to keep the streak alive. Colorado has not been shutout in a football game since November 12, 1988, when they played the Nebraska Cornhuskers. They have not been shutout at home since November 15, 1986, by the Oklahoma Sooners. Terrence Wheatley left the game with a knee injury during the 4th quarter, with his future status undetermined.

In the week after the game, Matt DiLallo was named to the Ray Guy Award watchlist.

Miami University 

Colorado beat the Miami University RedHawks by a score of 42–0. It was first time the RedHawks were shut out since a 1993 loss to Ball State. In sophomore quarterback Daniel Raudabaugh’s first start of the season for Miami, he completed 11 of 32 passes for only 95 yards. The Colorado defense was never able to sack Raudabaugh, but they did not allow him time to set his feet for passes. Colorado out gained Miami 634–139 in total yardage. The Buffaloes’ offense rushed for 359 after only running for 134 total yards in three previous games.

Oklahoma 

Oklahoma was first to score by capitalizing on a D. J. Wolfe interception returned to the Colorado 11. Sam Bradford connected with Juaquin Iglesias for the 13 yard touchdown. The Buffalo's scored next by driving the ball 70 yards capped off by a 25-yard touchdown rush by Hugh Charles. The Sooners responded 49 seconds later thanks to a 34-yard touchdown run by Allen Patrick. The Sooners added 3 more as a result of a 28-yard Hartley field goal to return to the locker rooms at halftime with a 17–7 lead.

Baylor

Kansas State

Kansas

Texas Tech

Missouri

Iowa State 

Colorado seemed to have this game under control with a 21—0 lead at halftime. However, Iowa State rallied back in the second half for the victory. Coach Hawkins made a controversial call going for a first down on 4th and 1 on Colorado's own 43—yard line after Iowa State refused a 10-yard holding penalty in the third quarter. The Buffaloes fell short of making the first down when Demetrius Sumler was stopped by Jesse Smith. Iowa State would score their first points of the game three plays later.

Bret Culbertson of Iowa State kicked a 24—yard field goal with 12:21 left in the game to put the Cyclones up 31—21. Kevin Eberhart of Colorado had earlier missed a 43—yard field goal. Colorado then fought back and Scotty McKnight scored a 9—yard touchdown pass from Cody Hawkins with 2:40 left in the game. The defensed forced a 3 and out after the kickoff to get the ball back with 46 seconds left in the game on their own 28 yard line. In 5 passing plays, 4 complete, they moved the ball 34 yards to the Iowa State 33 yard line. With no timeouts, they rushed the field goal unit on to the field and Eberhart made a 50—yard field goal with 1 second left on the clock. However, Colorado was penalized 5 yards for snapping the ball before it was whistled ready for play (officially Offensive Delay of Game) which nullified the field goal. With 1 second left on the clock, Eberhart again made the 55—yard field goal try, but the officials ruled the ball had not been snapped before time expired. The field goal was again nullified and the game was over.

Nebraska

Alabama 

Colorado earned a bowl bid to the Independence Bowl against the Alabama Crimson Tide on December 2, 2007. This was third football game ever between the two schools, with the teams having split the previous two games. They were also both bowl games, the 1969 Liberty Bowl, where Colorado won 47–33, and the 1991 Blockbuster Bowl where Alabama won 30–25.

Alabama scored on their opening drive off of a Leigh Tiffin field goal to lead 3–0. Colorado's first offensive play of the game resulted in an interception by Rolando McClain. Once again, Alabama relied on another field goal from Tiffin to push their lead to 6–0. Later in the quarter, Alabama's John Parker Wilson would throw a touchdown to Keith Brown and Matt Caddell to push the Crimson Tide to a 20–0 lead after one quarter. Early in the second quarter, Wilson would connect to Nikita Stover on a 31–yard touchdown pass and the Crimson Tide lead 27–0 after just under 20 minutes played in the game. The Buffaloes would control the majority of the second quarter after Wilson threw an interception. Buffaloes freshman quarterback Cody Hawkins threw touchdown passes to Tyson DeVree and Dusty Sprague to close the gap, as the Crimson Tide lead 27–14 at halftime. The only score in the third quarter would come from Kevin Eberhart on a Colorado field goal. Leigh Tiffin kicked a field goal as the Crimson Tide lead 30–17, though Cody Hawkins and Tyson DeVree would connect on another passing touchdown. In a desperation attempt with 0:01 left in the fourth quarter, Colorado would attempt several laterals but would fall short of midfield.

Alabama's victory sent them to a 7–6 overall record as they avoided a second consecutive losing season. Colorado had its second consecutive losing season for the first time in 22 years.

Statistics 
Colorado does not include bowl game statistics as part of their season total statistics. The statistics below therefore are for the 12 game regular season and do not include any statistics recorded during the bowl game against Alabama.

Source for all statistics below: https://web.archive.org/web/20110606161411/http://www.cubuffs.com/pdf3/100956.pdf?ATCLID=1207369&SPSID=3844&SPID=255&DB_OEM_ID=600

Team 

 The neutral site game against Colorado State is not recorded in the attendance figures above. The attendance for that game was 68,133.

Scores by quarter

Offense

Rushing 

 A t in the Long column means the play was also a touchdown.

Passing

Receiving 

 A "t" in the Long column means the play was also a touchdown.

Defense 

 A "t" in the Longest Interception return column means it was also for a touchdown.

Special teams

References

Colorado
Colorado Buffaloes football seasons
Colorado Buffaloes football